In Classical mythology, Crocus (Ancient Greek: Κρόκος, Krókos) was a mortal youth who was changed by the gods into a saffron flower.

Mythology 
Crocus was unhappy with his love affair with the nymph Smilax, and he was turned by the gods into a plant bearing his name, the crocus (saffron). Smilax is believed to have been given a similar fate and transformed into bindweed.

In another variation of the myth, Crocus was said to be a companion of Hermes and was accidentally killed by the god in a game of discus when he unexpectedly stood up. As the unfortunate youth's blood dripped on the soil, the saffron flower came to be. The myth is similar to that of Apollo and Hyacinthus, and may indeed be a variation or modelled after it thereof.

In his translation of Nonnos' Dionysiaca, W.H.D. Rouse describes the tale of Crocus as being from the late Classical period and little-known.

See also 
 Hyacinthus, another youth killed in a discus accident and turned into a flower
 Smilax, Crocus' lover turned into a shrub
 Clytie

Notes

References 
 Grimal, Pierre. A Concise Dictionary of Classical mythology. Basil Blackwell Ltd, 1990. - p. 109
 
 Nonnus of Panopolis, Dionysiaca translated by William Henry Denham Rouse (1863-1950), from the Loeb Classical Library, Cambridge, MA, Harvard University Press, 1940.  Online version at the Topos Text Project.
 Nonnus of Panopolis, Dionysiaca. 3 Vols. W.H.D. Rouse. Cambridge, MA., Harvard University Press; London, William Heinemann, Ltd. 1940-1942. Greek text available at the Perseus Digital Library.
 Publius Ovidius Naso, Metamorphoses translated by Brookes More (1859-1942). Boston, Cornhill Publishing Co. 1922. Online version at the Perseus Digital Library.
 Publius Ovidius Naso, Metamorphoses. Hugo Magnus. Gotha (Germany). Friedr. Andr. Perthes. 1892. Latin text available at the Perseus Digital Library.
 Smith, William, Dictionary of Greek and Roman Biography and Mythology, London (1873). Online version at the Perseus Digital Library.
Realencyclopädie der classischen Altertumswissenschaft, Band XI, Halbband 22, Komogrammateus-Kynegoi (1922) - ss. 1972-1973

External links 
 FLOWER MYTHS from The Theoi Project

Metamorphoses characters
Metamorphoses into flowers in Greek mythology
Deeds of Hermes
LGBT themes in Greek mythology
Greek literature (post-classical)